Alexander Stuart Wortley (born 1899 in York, d. 1980), was an English eccentric.

A Royal Navy veteran, he served in the Battle of Jutland aboard HMS Agincourt as runner to Captain Thynne.

Wortley died aged 80 having lived at least 25 years in a green painted box in a garden in Rowley Cottage, Langley Park, Buckinghamshire, donated by his friend David Moreau. It measured 5 x 4 x 3 feet with an extension for his feet and, with wheels. He was quoted as saying, to keep women out. He paid no rent, rates or taxes and did not believe in insurance, pensions or governments. It was listed in the Guinness Book of World Records as the smallest residence of the world.

Wortley was one of ten children; Four girls: Mary, Gladys, Selina and Kezia, and six boys; Leslie, Stanley, Charlie, Ronald, George and Alexander. His mother Mary was the 2nd wife of William George Wortley and she was one of the 35 women killed by the Barnbow munitions explosion in 1916.

He was one of the subjects of comedian Dave Allen in the 1974 ATV documentary 'Great English Eccentric'.

References

http://www.bbc.co.uk/programmes/b03n322v

1899 births
1980 deaths
Royal Navy personnel of World War I